Duplicaria brevicula is a species of sea snail, a marine gastropod mollusk in the family Terebridae, the auger snails.

Distribution
This marine species occurs in the Atlantic Ocean off Namibia.

References

 Bouchet, P., 1983. Les Terebridae de l'Atlantique oriental. Bollettino Malacologico 18: 185-216

External links
 Deshayes, G. P. (1859). A general review of the genus Terebra, and a description of new species. Proceedings of the Zoological Society of London. (1859) 27: 270-321.
 Dautzenberg, P. (1912). Mission Gruvel sur la côte occidentale d'Afrique (1909-1910): Mollusques marins. Annales de l'Institut Océanographique, Paris (Nouvelle Série). 5(3): 1-111, pl. 1-3
 Fedosov, A. E.; Malcolm, G.; Terryn, Y.; Gorson, J.; Modica, M. V.; Holford, M.; Puillandre, N. (2020). Phylogenetic classification of the family Terebridae (Neogastropoda: Conoidea). Journal of Molluscan Studies. 85(4): 359-388

Terebridae
Gastropods described in 1859